The London Nationals are a Canadian junior ice hockey team based in London, Ontario, Canada.  They play in the Western division of the Greater Ontario Junior Hockey League.

Paul Duarte is the current owner of the London Nationals.  The general manager and head coach is Pat Powers. The Nationals play their home games at the Western Fair Sports Centre. The arena's seating capacity is 1,800, and features an international-sized ice surface measuring 100' X 200'.

History

Early days — 1950
The team's life began in 1950, playing in The Big '10' Western Division out of the Ontario Arena at the Western Fair grounds. They won the Western Division title in 1952 as the London Lou Ball Juniors, after sponsor Lou Ball's clothing store. In 1956 the 'Big 10' was divided, and London became a member of the Western Ontario Junior "B" Hockey League.

Consistent representation of the city of London at the Jr. B level began in 1950 with the London Lou Ball Juniors, playing in The 'Big 10' Western Division out of the Ontario Arena at the Western Fairgrounds. The team was named after Lou Ball Clothes, which were stores owned by coach Lou Ball, and they won the championship the following season.  The team was known as the London Collinson Flyers during the 1955–56 season before reverting to Lou Ball Juniors for 2 more seasons. The name changed to London Diamonds in 1958, then to Athletics in 1960. In 1961 the team was renamed again. They were called the Nationals, after sponsor Canadian National Recreation Association, an organization of Canadian National Railways employees.

The Maple Leafs — 1963

In 1963 the Toronto Maple Leafs began sponsoring the Nationals.  The Maple Leafs traditionally had affiliations with the Toronto Marlboros and St. Michael's Majors, however with the withdrawal of the Majors from the OHA, and the collapse of the Metro Junior A League, the Leafs were left with only one team. They decided to sponsor the junior team in London, which they wanted to play at the new London Gardens and be promoted to the Ontario Hockey Association.

The OHA initially balked at the proposition however, and so the Nationals continued to play in the Junior B league, winning the London Free Press Trophy as league champions in 1964 and 1965. For the 1965–66 season, the team was finally admitted to major junior hockey, and London's Junior B franchise moved to Ingersoll to make room for the Junior A Nationals. The Junior A team was renamed as London Knights in 1968, and the Nationals name disappeared from the London sports landscape.

The Bees, Squires and Diamonds — 1966
The Junior B team returned to London under the name Bees for the 1966–1967 season, but then fell dormant for two seasons.  The team was revived in 1969 as the Squires, and played under that name until 1976.  The team was then known as the Diamonds from 1976–1991, before the Nationals name was revived after a long-lasting sponsorship with a diamond jeweler dissolved.

The team's time under the Diamonds name was successful, as they claimed the Western Ontario Hockey League title in 1981, 1983, and 1984.

Nationals Name Returns — 1991
The next change came when Kent Phibbs purchased the team and changed the name back to the London Nationals, and they won the Western Jr. B championship that same year. The team uniforms were once again the blue and white of the Maple Leafs and the team remained at Nichols Arena for a few years.

Mr. Phibbs now moved the team back to the Gardens. In the summer of 1998, the team was sold again, this time to the Doug Tarry Group (London Knights). The team remained playing at the same arena, but the name had changed to the London Ice House. The team colors and logo were changed to eggplant and teal to match the affiliate and the team still played at the London Ice House. The team's most recent championship came in 2019 (4th straight) as Western Conference Champions.

In 2013, the Nationals defeated the Cambridge Winterhawks to win their first-ever Sutherland Cup. The Nationals appeared in back-to-back Sutherland Cups in 2016 & 2017, and again in 2019.

In 2020, the Nationals marked their 70th anniversary as a Jr. B franchise in London.

Championships

Sutherland Cup
GOJHL Champions
2012–13 Champions vs. Cambridge Winterhawks

Bill Weir Trophy
GOJHL Western Conference Champions
2018–19 Champions vs. Leamington Flyers
2017–18 Champions vs. St. Thomas Stars
2016–17 Champions vs. Leamington Flyers
2015–16 Champions vs. Leamington Flyers
2012–13 Champions vs. Chatham Maroons
2011–12 Champions vs. Strathroy Rockets

Western Ontario Junior B Champions
Western Ontario Junior Hockey League
1991–92 Champions vs. Windsor Bulldogs
1983–84 Champions vs. Sarnia Bees
1982–83 Champions vs. Sarnia Bees
1980–81 Champions vs. Chatham Maroons
1974–75 Champions vs. St. Mary's Lincolns

Western Junior B Champions
Western Ontario Junior B Hockey League
1964–65 Champions vs. St. Thomas Barons
1963–64 Champions vs. St. Thomas Barons
1951–52 Champions vs. Sarnia Jr. Sailors

Season-by-season results

Playoffs

1950–51 Lost to Windsor 8–6 (2–3, 6–3)
1951–52 Defeated Windsor 3–0 in semi-finals  Defeated Sarnia 4–0 in finals. BIG '10' WESTERN CHAMPIONS
1952–53 Semi-final Round Robin. London Eliminated.
1953–54 Lost to Sarnia 4–0 in semi-finals.
1954–55 Lost to Sarnia 3–2 in semi-finals.
1955–56 Did not qualify
1956–57 Did not qualify
1957–58 Defeated Woodstock 3–0 in first round.  Defeated St. Mary's Lincolns 3–1 in semi-finals.  Lost to Sarnia Bees 4–1 in final.
1958–59 Lost to Sarnia Bees 4–1–1 in semi-finals
1959–60 Did not qualify
1960–61 Did not qualify
1961–62 Did not qualify
1962–63 Did not qualify
1963–64 Defeated Sarnia Bees 4–2 (7–4, 2–5, 4–2, 5–7, 6–2, 5–3) in semi-finals.  Defeated St. Thomas Barons 4–2 (7–6, 3–5, 4–2, 5–2, 3–7, 6–1) in finals. WOJHL CHAMPIONS
1964–65 Defeated Chatham Maroons 4–1 (4–6, 6–5, 5–3, 5–0, 7–4) in semi-finals.  Defeated St. Thomas Barons 4–0 (8–4, 6–3, 3–1, 7–5) in finals. WOJHL CHAMPIONS
1965–66 Lost to Sarnia Bees 4–1 (4–3, 2–8, 7–2, 3–2, 5–2) in semi-finals.
1966–67 Did not qualify
1967–68 Did not participate
1968–69 Did not participate
1970–78 NO RECORDS AVAILABLE 
1978–79 Defeated Petrolia Jets 7–3 (6-pt series) in first round.  Lost to Strathroy Blades 8–0 (8-pt series) in second round.
1980–80 Defeated Chatham Maroons 3–1 in first round.  Defeated Strathroy Blades 4–0 in second round.  Lost to Windsor 4–0 in finals.
1980–81 Defeated Windsor 4–0 (London advanced directly to final)  Defeated Chatham Maroons 4–1 in finals. WOJHL CHAMPIONS
1981–82 Defeated Chatham Maroons 3–0 in first round.  Defeated Petrol Jets 3–0 in second-round.  Lost to Sarnia 4–3 in finals. 
1982–83 Defeated St. Thomas Pests 5–2 in first round. (Best 5-of-9; London advanced directly to final)  Defeated Sarnia Steeplejacks 4–1 in finals. WOJHL CHAMPIONS
1983–84 Defeated Windsor 4–0 (London advanced directly to final)  Defeated Sarnia Steeplejacks 4–0 in finals. WOJHL CHAMPIONS
1984–85 Defeated St. Thomas Pests 3–0 (London advanced directly to final)
1985–86 Lost to Chatham Maroons 5–4 (Best 5-of-9) in first round.
1986–87 Defeated Chatham Maroons 4–0 in first round.  Second Round (Double Round-Robin): 1st - St. Thomas, 2nd - London, 3rd - Sarnia (eliminated)  Final: St. Thomas def. London 4–0
1988–89 Did not qualify
1989–90 Did not qualify
1990–91 Lost to St. Mary's Lincoln's 4–0 in quarter-final.
1991–92 Lost to Windsor 4–1 in quarter-final.
1992–93 Defeated St. Thomas Stars 4–1 in divisional semi-final.  Defeated St Mary's Lincolns 4–3 in divisional final.  Defeated Windsor 4–3 in finals. WOJHL CHAMPIONS
1993–94 Defeated St. Thomas Stars 4–1 in divisional semi-final.  Lost to St Mary's Lincolns 4–0 in divisional final.
1994–95 Defeated Aylmer 4–2 in divisional semi-final.  Lost to St Mary's Lincolns 4–0 in divisional final.
1995–96 Lost to St. Thomas Stars 4–0 in divisional semi-finals.
1996–97 Lost to St. Thomas Stars 4–0 in divisional semi-finals.
1997–98 Lost to St. Thomas Stars 4–1 in divisional semi-finals.
1998–99 Did not qualify.
1999–00 Lost to St. Thomas Stars 4–0 in divisional semi-finals.
2000–01 Did not qualify.
2001–02 Defeated Strathroy Rockets 4–2 in first round.  Defeated Sarnia Blast 4–2 in semi-finals.  Lost to Chatham 4–2 in finals. 
2002–03 Lost to Sarnia Blast 4–1 in quarter-finals 
2003–04 Defeated St. Thomas Stars 4–1 in quarter-finals  Lost to Sarnia Blast 4–3 in semi-finals.
2004–05 Defeated Leamington Flyers 4–2 in first round.  Defeated Sarnia Blast 4–0 in semi-finals.  Lost to Chatham 4–2 in finals. 
2005–06 Defeated St. Mary's Lincolns 4–1 in first round.  Lost to Chatham Maroons 4–0 in semi-finals.
2006–07 Lost to St. Mary's Lincolns 4–3 in quarter-finals.
2007–08 Lost to Sarnia Legionairres 4–3 in quarter-finals.
2008–09 Defeated Leamington Flyers 4–2 in first round.  Defeated St. Mary's Lincolns 4–0 in semi-finals.  Lost to Tecumseh Chiefs 4–1 in final.
2009–10 Defeated LaSalle Vipers 4–1 in first round.  Defeated St. Mary's Lincolns 4–3 in semi-finals.  Lost to Sarnia Legionaries 4–2 in final.
2010–11 Defeated Leamington Flyers 4–0 in first round.  Lost to St. Thomas Stars 4–2 in semi-finals.
2011–12 Defeated Sarnia Legionaries 4–0 in first round.  Defeated LaSalle Vipers 4–2 in semi-finals.  Lost to St. Thomas Stars 4–3 in final.
2012–13 Defeated LaSalle Vipers 4–1 in first round.  Defeated St. Mary's Lincolns 4–2 in semi-finals.  Defeated Strathroy Rockets 4–2 WESTERN CONFERENCE CHAMPIONS Defeated Cambridge Winterhawks 4–3 in the championship round. SUTHERLAND CUP CHAMPIONS
2013–14 Defeated St. Thomas Stars 4–2 in first round.  Lost to Leamington Flyers 4–1 in semi-finals. 
2014–15 Defeated Sarnia Legionnaries 4–3 in first round.  Lost to Leamington Flyers 4–1 in semi-finals. 
2015–16 Defeated Strathroy Rockets 4–2 in first round.  Defeated LaSalle Vipers 4–2 in semi-finals.  Defeated Leamington Flyers 4-2  WESTERN CONFERENCE CHAMPIONS Defeated Stratford Cullitons 4–2  Lost to Caledonia Corvairs 4–0 in final.
2016–17 Defeated St. Mary's Lincolns 4–1 in first round.  Defeated Chatham Maroons 4–1 in semi-finals.  Defeated Leamington Flyers 4–1  WESTERN CONFERENCE CHAMPIONS Defeated Listowel Cyclones 4–1  Lost to Elmira Sugar Kings 4–1 in Final.
2017–18 Defeated Strathroy Rockets 4–0 in first round.  Defeated Chatham Maroons 4–2 in semi-finals.  Defeated St. Thomas Stars 4–0  WESTERN CONFERENCE CHAMPIONS  Lost to Listowel Cyclones 4–1 in semi-finals 
2018–19 Defeated St. Thomas Stars 4–0 in first round.  Defeated LaSalle Vipers 4–1 in semi-finals.  Defeated Leamington Flyers 4–0  WESTERN CONFERENCE CHAMPIONS  Defeated Listowel Cyclones 4–1 in semi-finals  Lost to Waterloo Siskins 4–3 in Final.
2019–20 Defeated Sarnia Legionnaries 4–0 in first round.  Playoffs cancelled due to COVID-19 Pandemic

Sutherland Cup appearances
2013: London Nationals defeated Cambridge Winterhawks 4-games-to-3
2016: Caledonia Corvairs defeated London Nationals 4-games-to-none
2017: Elmira Sugar Kings defeated London Nationals 4-games-to-1
2019: Waterloo Siskins defeated London Nationals 4-games-to-3

Players

Retired numbers
16 – Tom Cardiff
22 – Patrick Dobie
29 – Taylor Edwards
39 – Scott Lombardi
96 – Aaron Dartch

NHL alumni
List of alumni who also played in the National Hockey League.

London Nationals Junior B
 Mike Corrigan
 Gerry Desjardins
 Darryl Edestrand
 Brandon Prust
 Mike Van Ryn

London Diamonds Junior B
 Bill Armstrong 
 Neal Coulter 
 Jeff Hackett 
 Ken Hammond 
 Dave Hutchison 
 Walt McKechnie 
 Dan Quinn 
 Craig Simpson 
 Scott Thornton

Awards

GOJHL Western Conference

Stan Moore Award
First Place - Western Conference
2017-18
2019-20

GOJHL Scoring Champion
2019-20 - Cal Davis

Kelly Hearn Award
Volunteer of the Year
1992–93 – Bill McCullough
2006–07 – Bill Westgate
2012–13 – Steve Davidson
2013–14 – Bruce Keck

Chester Pegg Memorial Award
Sportsmanship & Ability
1991–92 – Bill Weir
1995–96 – Craig Watson
2000–01 – Matt Meyer
2009–10 – Adam McKee
2010–11 – Noah Schwartz
2012–13 – Noah Schwartz
2018–19 – Cal Davis

Roy Bruhlman Memorial Award
Rookie of the Year
1989–90 – Keli Corpse
1990–91 – Trevor Gallant
1997–98 – Scott Dickier
2000–01 – Kyle Piwowarczyk

Phibbs Incorporated Award
Most Valuable 1st Year Defenseman 
1991–92 – Dan Brown
1992–93 – Chad Palmer
1993–94 – Chad Palmer
1994–95 – John Barrett
1996–97 – Mike Van Ryn
2008–09 – Jake McClelland
2013–14 – Matt Fuller
2015-16 - Jordan DiCicco
2019–20 – Logan Mailloux

Uni-Fab Award
Top Defenceman
2016-17 - Quinn Lenihan
2017-18 - Jordan DiCicco

Kevin McIntosh Award
Defensive Forward
2017-18 - Kyle Dawson

CHOK Award
Most Valuable Player
1992–93 – Chris Legg
1993–94 – Shane Johnson
2000–01 – Ash Goldie
2008–09 – Adam McKee
2018–19 – Cal Davis
2019–20 – Cal Davis

Phibbs Incorporated Award
Most Valuable Rookie Defenseman
2003–04 – Patrick Dobie
2014–15 – Justin Murray

Hugh McLean Award
Regular Season Scoring Champion
1982–83 – Craig Simpson
1988–89 – Bill Weir
1991–92 – Bill Weir
1992–93 – Mike Legg
1993–94 – Shane Johnson
2007–08 – Glenn McCarron
2009–10 – Adam McKee
2016–17 – Brenden Trottier
2018–19 – Cal Davis
2019–20 – Cal Davis

Pat & Jackie Stapleton Award
Playoff Scoring Champion
2000–01 – Ashe Goldie

Sharon Williamson Award
Playoff MVP
2012–13 – Noah Schwartz

Southland Insurance Award
Top Points - Rookie
2019–20 – Logan Mailloux

Smith-Buys Award
Rookie Scoring Champion
2000–01 – Kyle Piwowarczyk

Roy Caley Award
Best Team Goals Against Average
1979–80 –
1980–81 – 
1982–83 – D. Sceli, Craig Billington
1983–84 – Richard McCullough, Rob Nixon
1984–85 – 
1985–86 – 
1986–87 – Joe Noval, Brian Morris
1991–92 – Shawn O'Hagan, Dave Grasso
1995–96 – Steve Tutt, Ian Burt
2009–10 – Mike Coulter, Taylor Edwards
2016–17 – Cameron Zanussi, Trenten McGrail
2017–18 – David Ovsjannikov, Zach Springer
2019–20 – Shawn Wiranata

Team records

As of January 19, 2020

Arenas

Ontario Arena, 1950–1963
Built : 
Capacity : .
Ice Size : 190' x 85'
Original home of the London Nationals. Built on the property of the Western Fair.

London Gardens/London Ice House, 1976–2001
Built : 1963
Capacity : 5,075 including standing room.
Ice Size : 190' x 85'
The London Gardens (see article) was built in 1963 and served as the home of the Nationals from 1963 to its closing in 2001. The building was renamed London Ice House in 1994. The arena is currently home to the Forest City Velodrome.

Ray Lanctin Arena (Medway Arena), 2002–2005
Built : 1967
Capacity : N/A.
Ice Size : 100' x 200'
Medway Arena was renovated in 2009 after being built in 1967.  Renovations include updates to the community centre, flooring and rink boards.  Winter skating programs and events run throughout the winter season, and arena pad is available for lacrosse during the summer season.  This facility is also equipped with a hall and kitchenette, perfect for private rentals..

Western Fair Sports Centre, 2006–present
Built : 1995
Capacity : 1,500 including standing room.
Ice Size : 100' x 200'
The Sports Centre at Western Fair District is a state-of-the-art 160,000 square foot multi-use facility known as a leader amongst the many ice facilities available in London and Ontario.

Other arenas
Lambeth Arena
Earl Nicols Arena
Ray Lanctin Arena
Glencoe Arena

Uniforms and logos

The original London Nationals were modelled off their parent club, the Toronto Maple Leafs up until the change to the London Knights. The team's logo was the same Leaf as used by the parent club at the time, except with the words "London Nationals" written out across the leaf instead of "Toronto Maple Leafs" The team over went numerous logo and uniform changes with sponsors including Chester Pegg & Phibbs Incorporated. The team adopted similar colours to the Knights (Eggplant & teal) in the 1990s to look more like their Jr A affiliate. The Knight's move to more modern colours in 2002 brought the Nationals' look back to the familiar blue & white look. Today's uniforms mimic the Maple Leafs look, adopting a blue, white & black colour scheme. In 2015, the Nationals adopted a black alternate jerseys with the team's crest logo.

Mascot
The Nationals' mascot is now known as "Lou", a tribute to the Lou Ball Juniors, a Jr. B team which played out of the Ontario Arena at the Western Fairgrounds beginning in 1950. The winning name was submitted in a "Name The Mascot" contest. Lou made his first appearance in 2012.

References

External links
Nationals Webpage
GOJHL Webpage

Sports teams in London, Ontario
Western Junior B Hockey League teams